The Újpest Water Tower is one of many water towers in Budapest.

History
The Újpest Water Tower played an important role in World War II. Explosives were stored within the tower, possibly reserved for its later destruction. In December 1944, Hungarian partisans ambushed the Arrow Cross guards and seized the ammunition, thus preventing the tower from being destroyed. Had it been destroyed, the entire area would have been left without water.

References
 

Újpest
Water towers in Hungary
Art Nouveau architecture in Budapest
Art Nouveau industrial buildings
Industrial buildings completed in 1912
1912 establishments in Austria-Hungary